Cédrik Ramos (born 15 February 1983 in Gassin) is a French former professional footballer who played as a midfielder.

He played on the professional level in USL Second Division for Wilmington Hammerheads.

References

External links
 

1983 births
Living people
Association football midfielders
French footballers
Championnat National players
Championnat National 2 players
Championnat National 3 players
Wilmington Hammerheads FC players
ÉFC Fréjus Saint-Raphaël players
US Orléans players
CA Bastia players
SC Toulon players
French expatriate footballers
French expatriate sportspeople in the United States
Expatriate soccer players in the United States